Coteni may refer to several villages in Romania:

 Coteni, a village in Buhoci Commune, Bacău County
 Coteni, a village in Bulbucata Commune, Giurgiu County
 Coteni, a village in Obârșia Commune, Olt County